Serene may refer to:

Sérène, another name for the French wine grape Servanin
Serene (phone), a telephone jointly developed by Samsung and Bang & Olufsen
Serene (yacht), one of the world's largest private superyachts
Serene, Colorado, a company town in Colorado
Jaunjelgava or Serene, a city in Latvia
Serene, a heroine in Riviera: The Promised Land

People with the name
Serene (pianist) (born 1991), American classical pianist
Serene Koong (born 1988), Singapore singer-songwriter
Serene Ross (born 1977), American javelin thrower
Serene Husseini Shahid (1920–2008), Palestinian writer

See also
 
Seren (disambiguation)
Serena (disambiguation)
Serenity (disambiguation)